Southwest University may refer to:

Southwest University in Chongqing, China
Southwest University (Louisiana) the for-profit college in Kenner, Louisiana
South-West University "Neofit Rilski" in Blagoevgrad, Bulgaria
University of the Southwest in Hobbs, New Mexico, USA

See also
Southwest College, a community college in Houston, Texas
Southwestern University (disambiguation)
Southwestern College (disambiguation)
Southwestern Community College (disambiguation)